Santander State was one of the states of Colombia. Today the area of the former state makes up most of modern-day areas of the Santander Department and Norte de Santander Department in northeastern Colombia.

Limits 
In 1863 it bordered:

 Antioquia State in the West.
 Boyacá State in the South.
 Bolívar State and Magdalena State in the North.

Naming 
 1857-05-13 created as Estado Federal de Santander (Federal State of Santander).
 1858 recognized as Estado de la Federación in the constitution of the Granadine Confederation,
 1863 name Estado Soberano (Sovereign State of Santander) in the constitution of the United States of Colombia

Subdivisions 

In 1857 the state was divided into the following departamentos:

 Barichara.
 Bucaramanga.
 Charalá.
 Fortul.
 Ocaña.
 Pamplona.
 San Gil.
 Socorro.
 Vélez.

The law of 17 April 1859 divided the state into  7 departamentos:

 Róvira Department (capital Concepción).
 Ocaña Department (capital Ocaña).
 Pamplona Department (capital Pamplona).
 Santander Department (capital San José de Cúcuta).
 Socorro Department (capital Socorro).
 Soto Department (capital Bucaramanga).

In 1860 two more departamentos were created:

 Guanentá Department (capital San Gil).
 Charalá Department (capital Charalá).

References

See also
Colombian Civil War (1860-1862)

States of Colombia
Sovereign States of the Granadine Confederation
1857 establishments in the Republic of New Granada